The Infante Carlos of Spain, also known as The Infante Charles of Spain (15 September 1607 – 30 July 1632), was an infante of Spain, the second son of King Felipe III of Spain and Margaret of Austria.

Life
The Infante Carlos was the younger brother of Felipe IV, and, as long as the King remained childless, was heir to the Spanish throne. Carlos was never a friend of Felipe's favourite and prime minister, the Count-Duke of Olivares, and though he was uninterested in politics, he was used by various nobles in attempts to overthrow Olivares.

During his brother's severest illness, Carlos was on the point of ascending the throne, but Felipe recovered and in 1629 finally fathered a son, Balthasar Carlos. This dissipated Carlos's political importance completely.

Contemporaries described him as prudent and liberal and he seemed to have been a "vigilant observer of royal customs". Other than his brother Fernando, who was assigned a role at an early age, he remained in a child-like position until his mid-twenties. Although he received official visits and expressed political opinions, he remained without an own household, remaining in the household of the king.

He died in 1632, aged 24. Francisco de Quevedo dedicated a sonnet entitled The Burial of the Most Serene Infante Don Carlos to this event.

Ancestry

References

Spanish infantes
1607 births
1632 deaths
17th-century House of Habsburg
Burials in the Pantheon of Infantes at El Escorial
Sons of kings